The  was the navy of Germany from 1935 to 1945. It superseded the Imperial German Navy of the German Empire (1871–1918) and the inter-war  (1919–1935) of the Weimar Republic.

In violation of the Treaty of Versailles, the  grew rapidly during German naval rearmament in the 1930s. The 1919 treaty had limited the size of the German navy and prohibited the building of submarines.

 ships were deployed to the waters around Spain during the Spanish Civil War (1936–1939) under the guise of enforcing non-intervention, but in reality supporting the Nationalists against the Spanish Republicans.

In January 1939, Plan Z, a massive shipbuilding program, was ordered, calling for surface naval parity with the British Royal Navy by 1944. When World War II broke out in September 1939, Plan Z was shelved in favour of a crash building program for submarines (U-boats) instead of capital surface warships, and land and air forces were given priority of strategic resources.

Among the 's most significant ships were its U-boats, most of which were constructed after Plan Z was abandoned at the beginning of World War II. Wolfpacks were rapidly assembled groups of submarines which attacked British convoys during the first half of the Battle of the Atlantic but this tactic was largely abandoned by May 1943 when U-boat losses mounted. Along with the U-boats, surface commerce raiders (including auxiliary cruisers) were used to disrupt Allied shipping in the early years of the war, the most famous of these being the heavy cruisers Admiral Graf Spee and Admiral Scheer and the battleship Bismarck. However, the adoption of convoy escorts, especially in the Atlantic, greatly reduced the effectiveness of surface commerce raiders against convoys.

Following the end of World War II in 1945, the 's remaining ships were divided up among the Allied powers and were used for various purposes including minesweeping. Some were loaded with superfluous chemical weapons and scuttled.

History

Post–World War I origins
Under the terms of the 1919 Treaty of Versailles, Germany was only allowed a minimal navy of 15,000 personnel, six capital ships of no more than 10,000 tons, six cruisers, twelve destroyers, twelve torpedo boats and no submarines or aircraft carriers. Military aircraft were also banned, so Germany could have no naval aviation. Under the treaty Germany could only build new ships to replace old ones. All the ships allowed and personnel were taken over from the Kaiserliche Marine, renamed the Reichsmarine.

From the outset, Germany worked to circumvent the military restrictions of the Treaty of Versailles. The Germans continued to develop U-boats through a submarine design office in the Netherlands (NV Ingenieurskantoor voor Scheepsbouw) and a torpedo research program in Sweden where the G7e torpedo was developed.

Even before the Nazi seizure of power on 30 January 1933 the German government decided on 15 November 1932 to launch a prohibited naval re-armament program that included U-boats, airplanes and an aircraft carrier.

The launching of the first pocket battleship,  in 1931 (as a replacement for the old pre-dreadnought battleship ) was a step in the formation of a modern German fleet. The building of the Deutschland caused consternation among the French and the British as they had expected that the restrictions of the Treaty of Versailles would limit the replacement of the pre-dreadnought battleships to coastal defence ships, suitable only for defensive warfare. By using innovative construction techniques, the Germans had built a heavy ship suitable for offensive warfare on the high seas while still abiding by the letter of the treaty.

Nazi control
When the Nazis came to power in 1933, Adolf Hitler soon began to more brazenly ignore many of the Treaty restrictions and accelerated German naval rearmament. The Anglo-German Naval Agreement of 18 June 1935 allowed Germany to build a navy equivalent to 35% of the British surface ship tonnage and 45% of British submarine tonnage; battleships were to be limited to no more than 35,000 tons. That same year the Reichsmarine was renamed as the Kriegsmarine. In April 1939, as tensions escalated between the United Kingdom and Germany over Poland, Hitler unilaterally rescinded the restrictions of the Anglo-German Naval Agreement.

The building-up of the German fleet in the time period of 1935–1939 was slowed by problems with marshaling enough manpower and material for ship building. This was because of the simultaneous and rapid build-up of the German army and air force which demanded substantial effort and resources. Some projects, like the D-class cruisers and the P-class cruisers, had to be cancelled.

Spanish Civil War

The first military action of the Kriegsmarine came during the Spanish Civil War (1936–1939). Following the outbreak of hostilities in July 1936 several large warships of the German fleet were sent to the region. These large ships were accompanied by the 2nd Torpedo-boat Flotilla. The German presence was used to covertly support Franco's Nationalists although the immediate involvement of the Deutschland was humanitarian relief operations and evacuating 9,300 refugees, including 4,550 German citizens. Following the brokering of the International Non-Intervention Patrol to enforce an international arms embargo the Kriegsmarine was allotted the patrol area between Cabo de Gata (Almeria) and Cabo de Oropesa. Numerous vessels served as part of these duties including . On 29 May 1937 the Deutschland was attacked off Ibiza by two bombers from the Republican Air Force. Total casualties from the Republican attack were 31 dead and 110 wounded, 71 seriously, mostly burn victims. In retaliation the Admiral Scheer shelled Almeria on 31 May killing 19–20 civilians, wounding 50 and destroying 35 buildings.

U-boats also participated in covert action against Republican shipping as part of Operation Ursula. At least eight U-boats engaged a small number of targets in the area throughout the conflict. (By comparison the Italian Regia Marina operated 58 submarines in the area as part of the Sottomarini Legionari.)

Plan Z

The Kriegsmarine saw as her main tasks the controlling of the Baltic Sea and winning a war against France in connection with the German army, because France was seen as the most likely enemy in the event of war. But in 1938 Hitler wanted to have the possibility of winning a war against Great Britain at sea in the coming years. Therefore, he ordered plans for such a fleet from the Kriegsmarine. From the three proposed plans (X, Y and Z) he approved Plan Z in January 1939. This blueprint for the new German naval construction program envisaged building a navy of approximately 800 ships during the period 1939–1947. Hitler demanded that the program was to be completed by 1945. The main force of Plan Z were six H-class battleships. In the version of Plan Z drawn up in August 1939 the German fleet was planned to consist of the following ships by 1945:
 4 aircraft carriers
 10 battleships
 15 armored ships (Panzerschiffe)
 3 battlecruisers
 5 heavy cruisers
 44 light cruisers
 158 destroyers and torpedo boats
 249 submarines
 Numerous smaller craft
Personnel strength was planned to rise to over 200,000.

The planned naval program was not very far advanced by the time World War II began. In 1939 two s and two H-class battleships were laid down and parts for two further H-class battleships and three s were in production. The strength of the German fleet at the beginning of the war was not even 20% of Plan Z. On 1 September 1939, the navy still had a total personnel strength of only 78,000, and it was not at all ready for a major role in the war. Because of the long time it would take to get the Plan Z fleet ready for action and shortage in workers and material in wartime, Plan Z was essentially shelved in September 1939 and the resources allocated for its realization were largely redirected to the construction of U-boats, which would be ready for war against the United Kingdom more quickly.

World War II

The Kriegsmarine participated in the Battle of Westerplatte and the Battle of the Danzig Bay during the invasion of Poland. Submarine attacks on Britain's vital maritime supply routes (Battle of the Atlantic) started immediately at the outbreak of war, although they were hampered by the lack of well placed ports from which to operate. Throughout the war the Kriegsmarine was responsible for coastal artillery protecting major ports and important coastal areas. It also operated anti-aircraft batteries protecting major ports.

In April 1940, the German Navy was heavily involved in the invasion of Norway, where it suffered significant losses, which included the heavy cruiser  sunk by artillery and torpedoes from Norwegian shore batteries at the Oscarsborg Fortress in the Oslofjord. Ten destroyers were lost in the Battles of Narvik (half of German destroyer strength at the time), and two light cruisers, the Königsberg which was bombed and sunk by Royal Navy aircraft in Bergen, and the Karlsruhe which was sunk off the coast of Kristiansand by a British submarine. The Kriegsmarine did in return sink some British warships during this campaign, including the aircraft carrier .

The losses in the Norwegian Campaign left only a handful of undamaged heavy ships available for the planned, but never executed, invasion of the United Kingdom (Operation Sea Lion) in the summer of 1940. There were serious doubts that the invasion sea routes could have been protected against British naval interference. The Fall of France and the conquest of Norway gave German submarines greatly improved access to British shipping routes in the Atlantic. At first, British convoys lacked escorts that were adequate either in numbers or equipment and, as a result, the submarines had much success for few losses (this period was dubbed the First Happy Time by the Germans).

Italy entered the war in June 1940, and the Battle of the Mediterranean began: from September 1941 to May 1944 some 62 German submarines were transferred there, sneaking past the British naval base at Gibraltar. The Mediterranean submarines sank 24 major Allied warships (including 12 destroyers, 4 cruisers, 2 aircraft carriers and 1 battleship) and 94 merchant ships (449,206 tons of shipping). None of the Mediterranean submarines made it back to their home bases, as they were all either sunk in battle or scuttled by their crews at the end of the war.

In 1941 one of the four modern German battleships,  sank  while breaking out into the Atlantic for commerce raiding. Bismarck was in turn hunted down by much superior British forces after being crippled by an air-launched torpedo. She was subsequently scuttled after being rendered a burning wreck by two British battleships.

In November 1941 during the Battle of the Mediterranean, German submarine U-331 sank British battleship Barham, which had a magazine explosion and sank in minutes, with the loss of 862, or  2/3 of her crew.

This course of events were the result of the American decision to support Britain with its Lend-Lease program and the subsequent decision to escort Lend-Lease convoys with American war ships through the western part of the Atlantic.

The Japanese attack on Pearl Harbor and the subsequent German declaration of war against the United States in December 1941 led to another phase of the Battle of the Atlantic. In Operation Drumbeat and subsequent operations until August 1942, a large number of Allied merchant ships were sunk by submarines off the American coast as the Americans had not prepared for submarine warfare, despite clear warnings (this was the so-called Second Happy Time for the German Navy). The situation became so serious that military leaders feared for the whole Allied strategy. The vast American ship building capabilities and naval forces were however now brought into the war and soon more than offset any losses inflicted by the German submariners. In 1942, the submarine warfare continued on all fronts, and when German forces in the Soviet Union reached the Black Sea, a few submarines were eventually transferred there.

In February 1942, the three large warships stationed on the Atlantic coast at Brest were evacuated back to German ports for deployment to Norway. The ships had been repeatedly damaged by air attacks by the RAF, the supply ships to support Atlantic sorties had been destroyed by the Royal Navy, and Hitler now felt that Norway was the "zone of destiny" for these ships. Not since the Spanish Armada in 1588 had any warships in wartime done this. It was a tactical victory for the Kriegsmarine and a blow to British morale, but the withdrawal removed the possibility of attacking allied convoys in the Atlantic with heavy surface ships.

With the German attack on the Soviet Union in June 1941 Britain started to send Arctic convoys with military goods around Norway to support their new ally. In 1942 German forces began heavily attacking these convoys, mostly with bombers and U-boats. The big ships of the Kriegsmarine in Norway were seldom involved in these attacks, because of the inferiority of German radar technology, and because Hitler and the leadership of the Kriegsmarine feared losses of these precious ships. The most effective of these attacks was the near destruction of Convoy PQ 17 in July 1942. Later in the war German attacks on these convoys were mostly reduced to U-boat activities and the mass of the allied freighters reached their destination in Soviet ports.

The Battle of the Barents Sea in December 1942 was an attempt by a German naval surface force to attack an Allied Arctic convoy. However, the advantage was not pressed home and they returned to base. There were serious implications: this failure infuriated Hitler, who nearly enforced a decision to scrap the surface fleet. Instead, resources were diverted to new U-boats, and the surface fleet became a lesser threat to the Allies.

The largest of these ships, the battleship , was stationed in Norway as a threat to Allied shipping and also as a defence against a potential Allied invasion. When she was sunk, after several attempts, by British bombers in November 1944 (Operation Catechism), several British capital ships could be moved to the Far East.

Large parts of the population of eastern Germany fled the approaching Red Army out of fear for Soviet retaliation (mass rapes, killings and looting by Soviet troops did occur). The Kriegsmarine evacuated two million civilians and troops in the evacuation of East Prussia and Danzig from January to May 1945. The Kriegsmarine also provided important assistance in the evacuation of the fleeing German civilians of Pomerania and Stettin in March and April 1945.

A desperate measure of the Kriegsmarine to fight the superior strength of the Western Allies from 1944 was the formation of the Kleinkampfverbände (Small Battle Units). These were special naval units with frogmen, manned torpedoes, motorboats laden with explosives and so on. The more effective of these weapons and units were the development and deployment of midget submarines like the Molch and Seehund. In the last stage of the war, the Kriegsmarine also organized a number of divisions of infantry from its personnel.

Between 1943 and 1945, a group of U-boats known as the Monsun Boats (Monsun Gruppe) operated in the Indian Ocean from Japanese bases in the occupied Dutch East Indies and Malaya. Allied convoys had not yet been organized in those waters, so initially many ships were sunk. However, this situation was soon remedied. During the later war years, the Monsun Boats were also used as a means of exchanging vital war supplies with Japan.

During 1943 and 1944, due to Allied anti-submarine tactics and better equipment the U-boat fleet started to suffer heavy losses. The turning point of the Battle of the Atlantic was during Black May in 1943, when the U-boat fleet started suffering heavy losses and the number of Allied ships sunk started to decrease. Radar, longer range air cover, sonar, improved tactics and new weapons all contributed. German technical developments, such as the Schnorchel, attempted to counter these. Near the end of the war a small number of the new Elektroboot U-boats (types XXI and XXIII) became operational, the first submarines designed to operate submerged at all times. The Elektroboote had the potential to negate the Allied technological and tactical advantage, although they were deployed too late to see combat in the war.

War crimes

Following the capture of Liepāja in Latvia by the Germans on 29 June 1941, the town came under the command of the Kriegsmarine. On 1 July 1941, the town commandant Korvettenkapitän Stein ordered that ten hostages be shot for every act of sabotage, and further put civilians in the zone of targeting by declaring that Red Army soldiers were hiding among them in civilian attire.

On 5 July 1941 Korvettenkapitän Brückner, who had taken over from Stein, issued a set of anti-Jewish regulations in the local newspaper, Kurzemes Vārds. Summarized these were as follows:
 All Jews were to wear the yellow star on the front and back of their clothing;
 Shopping hours for Jews were restricted to 10:00 a.m. to 12:00 noon. Jews were only allowed out of their residences for these hours and from 3:00 p.m. to 5:00 p.m.;
 Jews were barred from public events and transportation and were not to walk on the beach;
 Jews were required to leave the pavement if they encountered a German in uniform;
 Jewish shops were required to display the sign "A Jewish-owned business" in the window;
 Jews were to surrender all radios, typewriters, uniforms, arms and means of transportation

On 16 July 1941, Fregattenkapitän Dr. Hans Kawelmacher was appointed the German naval commandant in Liepāja. On 22 July, Kawelmacher sent a telegram to the German Navy's Baltic Command in Kiel, which stated that he wanted 100 SS and fifty Schutzpolizei (protective police) men sent to Liepāja for "quick implementation Jewish problem". Kawelmacher hoped to accelerate killings complaining: "Here about 8,000 Jews... with present SS-personnel, this would take one year, which is untenable for [the] pacification of Liepāja." Kawelmacher on 27 July 1941: "Jewish problem Libau largely solved by execution of about 1,100 male Jews by Riga SS commando on 24 and 25.7."

Post-war division
The US used the heavy cruiser  in nuclear testing at Bikini Atoll in 1946 as a target ship for the Operation Crossroads. Some (like the unfinished aircraft carrier ) were used for target practice with conventional weapons, while others (mostly destroyers and torpedo boats) were put into the service of Allied navies that lacked surface ships after the war. The training barque SSS Horst Wessel was recommissioned USCGC Eagle and remains in active service, assigned to the United States Coast Guard Academy. The British, French and Soviet navies received the destroyers, and some torpedo boats went to the Danish and Norwegian navies. For the purpose of mine clearing, the Royal Navy employed German crews and minesweepers from June 1945 to January 1948, organized in the German Mine Sweeping Administration, the GMSA, which consisted of 27,000 members of the former Kriegsmarine and 300 vessels.

The destroyers and the Soviet share light cruiser  were all retired by the end of the 1950s, but five escort destroyers were returned from the French to the new West German navy in the 1950s and three 1945 scuttled type XXI and XXIII U-boats were raised by West Germany and integrated into their new navy. In 1956, with West Germany's accession to NATO, a new navy was established and was referred to as the Bundesmarine (Federal Navy). Some Kriegsmarine commanders like Erich Topp and Otto Kretschmer went on to serve in the Bundesmarine. In East Germany the Volksmarine (People's Navy) was established in 1956. With the reunification of Germany in 1990, it was decided to use the name Deutsche Marine (German Navy).

Major wartime operations
 Wikinger ("Viking") (1940) – foray by destroyers into the North Sea
 Weserübung ("Operation Weser") (1940) – invasion of Denmark and Norway
 Juno (1940) – operation to disrupt Allied supplies to Norway
 Nordseetour (1940) – first Atlantic operation of Admiral Hipper
 Berlin (1941) – Atlantic cruise of Scharnhorst and Gneisenau
 Rheinübung ("Rhine exercise") (1941) – breakout by Bismarck and Prinz Eugen
 Doppelschlag ("Double blow") (1942) – anti-shipping operation off Novaya Zemlya by Admiral Scheer and Admiral Hipper
 Sportpalast (1942) – aborted operation (including Tirpitz) to attack Arctic convoys
 Rösselsprung ("Knights Move") (1942) – operation (including Tirpitz) to attack Arctic convoy PQ 17
 Wunderland (1942) – anti-shipping operation in Kara Sea by Admiral Scheer
 Paukenschlag ("Drumbeat" ("Beat of the Kettle Drum"); "Second Happy Time") (1942) – U-boat campaign off the United States east coast
 Neuland ("New Land") (1942) – U-boat campaign in the Caribbean Sea; launched in conjunction with Operation Drumbeat
 Regenbogen ("Rainbow") (1942) – failed attack on Arctic convoy JW 51B, by Admiral Hipper and Lützow
 Cerberus (1942) – movement of capital ships from Brest to home ports in Germany (Channel Dash)
 Ostfront ("East front") (1943) – final operation of Scharnhorst, to intercept convoy JW 55B
 Domino (1943) – second aborted Arctic sortie by Scharnhorst, Prinz Eugen and destroyers
 Zitronella ("Lemon extract") (1943) – raid upon Allied-occupied Spitzbergen (Svalbard)
 Hannibal (1945) – evacuation proceedings from Courland, Danzig-West Prussia and East Prussia
 Deadlight (1945) – the British Royal Navy's postwar scuttling of Kriegsmarine U-boats

Ships

By the start of World War II, much of the Kriegsmarine were modern ships: fast, well-armed and well-armoured. This had been achieved by concealment but also by deliberately flouting World War I peace terms and those of various naval treaties. However, the war started with the German Navy still at a distinct disadvantage in terms of sheer size with what were expected to be its primary adversaries – the navies of France and Great Britain. Although a major re-armament of the navy (Plan Z) was planned, and initially begun, the start of the war in 1939 meant that the vast amounts of material required for the project were diverted to other areas. The sheer disparity in size when compared to the other European powers navies prompted German naval commander in chief Grand Admiral Erich Raeder to write of his own navy once the war began "The surface forces can do no more than show that they know how to die gallantly." A number of captured ships from occupied countries were added to the German fleet as the war progressed. Though six major units of the Kriegsmarine were sunk during the war (both Bismarck-class battleships and both Scharnhorst-class battleships, as well as two heavy cruisers), there were still many ships afloat (including four heavy cruisers and four light cruisers) as late as March 1945.

Some ship types do not fit clearly into the commonly used ship classifications. Where there is argument, this has been noted.

Surface ships
The main combat ships of the Kriegsmarine (excluding U-boats):

Aircraft carriers
In 1942 conversion of three German passenger ships (Europa, Potsdam, Gneisenau) and two unfinished cruisers, the captured French light cruiser  and the German heavy cruiser , to auxiliary carriers was begun. In November 1942 the conversion of the passenger ships was stopped because these ships were now seen as too slow for operations with the fleet. But conversion of one of these ships, the Potsdam, to a training carrier was begun instead. In February 1943 all the work on carriers was halted because of the German failure during the Battle of the Barents Sea which convinced Hitler that big warships were useless.

All engineering of the aircraft carriers like catapults, arresting gears and so on were tested and developed at the Erprobungsstelle See Travemünde (Experimental Agency Sea in Travemünde) including the airplanes for the aircraft carriers, the Fieseler Fi 167 ship-borne biplane torpedo and reconnaissance bomber and the navalized versions of two key early war Luftwaffe aircraft: the Messerschmitt Bf 109T fighter and Junkers Ju 87C Stuka dive bomber.

Battleships
The Kriegsmarine completed four battleships during its existence. The Bismarck was sunk on her first sortie into the Atlantic in 1941 (Operation Rheinübung) although she did sink the battlecruiser Hood and severely damaged the battleship Prince of Wales, while the Tirpitz was based in Norwegian ports during most of the war as a fleet in being, tying up Allied naval forces, and subject to a number of attacks by British aircraft and submarines. More battleships were planned (the H-class), but construction was abandoned in September 1939.

Pocket battleships (Panzerschiffe)
Modern commentators favour classifying these as "heavy cruisers" and the Kriegsmarine itself reclassified these ships as such (Schwere Kreuzer) in 1940. In German language usage these three ships were designed and built as "armoured ships" (Panzerschiffe) – "pocket battleship" is an English label.

The Graf Spee was scuttled by her own crew in the Battle of the River Plate, in the Rio de la Plata estuary in December 1939. Admiral Scheer was bombed on 9 April 1945 in port at Kiel and badly damaged, essentially beyond repair, and rolled over at her moorings. After the war that part of the harbor was filled in with rubble and the hulk buried. Lützow (ex-Deutschland) was bombed 16 April 1945 in the Baltic off Schwinemünde just west of Stettin, and settled on the shallow bottom. With the Soviet Army advancing across the Oder, the ship was destroyed in place to prevent the Soviets capturing anything useful. The wreck was dismantled and scrapped in 1948–1949.

Pre-dreadnought battleships
Plans to convert her into a radio-controlled target ship for aircraft was canceled because of the outbreak of war in 1939.

Battlecruisers
Three s were ordered in 1939, but with the start of the war the same year there were not enough resources to build the ships.

Heavy cruisers

Never completed: ,

Light cruisers

The term "light cruiser" is a shortening of the phrase "light armoured cruiser". Light cruisers were defined under the Washington Naval Treaty by gun caliber. Light cruiser describes a small ship that was armoured in the same way as an armoured cruiser. In other words, like standard cruisers, light cruisers possessed a protective belt and a protective deck. Prior to this, smaller cruisers tended to be of the protected cruiser model and possessed only an armoured deck. The Kriegsmarine light cruisers were as follows:
 
 
 
 
 
 

Never completed: three s

Never completed: KH-1 and KH-2 (Kreuzer (cruiser) Holland 1 and 2). Captured in the Netherlands 1940. Both being on the stocks and building continued for the Kriegsmarine.

In addition, the former Kaiserliche Marine light cruiser  was captured by Germans on 11 September 1943 after the capitulation of Italy. She was pressed into Kriegsmarine service for a brief time before being destroyed by British MTBs.

Auxiliary cruisers

During the war, some merchant ships were converted into "auxiliary cruisers" and nine were used as commerce raiders sailing under false flags to avoid detection, and operated in all oceans with considerable effect. The German designation for the ships was 'Handelstörkreuzer' thus the HSK serial assigned. Each had as well an administrative label more commonly used, e.g. Schiff 16 = Atlantis, Schiff 41 = Kormoran, etc. The auxiliary cruisers were:
  (HSK-1, Schiff 36)
  (HSK-2, Schiff 16)
  (HSK-3, Schiff 21)
  (HSK-4, Schiff 10)
  (HSK-5, Schiff 33)
  (HSK-6, Schiff 23)
  (HSK-7, Schiff 45)
  (HSK-8, Schiff 41)
  (HSK-9, Schiff 28)
  (HSK number not assigned, Schiff 14, never active in raider operations.)
  (HSK not assigned, Schiff 5, never active in raider operations, used as a training ship)

Destroyers

Although the German World War II destroyer (Zerstörer) fleet was modern and the ships were larger than conventional destroyers of other navies, they had problems. Early classes were unstable, wet in heavy weather, suffered from engine problems and had short range. Some problems were solved with the evolution of later designs, but further developments were curtailed by the war and, ultimately, by Germany's defeat. In the first year of World War II, they were used mainly to sow offensive minefields in shipping lanes close to the British coast.

Torpedo boats

These vessels evolved through the 1930s from small vessels, relying almost entirely on torpedoes, to what were effectively small destroyers with mines, torpedoes and guns. Two classes of fleet torpedo boats were planned, but not built, in the 1940s.

E-boats (Schnellboote)

The E-boats were fast attack craft with torpedo tubes. Over 200 boats of this type were built for the Kriegsmarine.

Troop ships

Miscellaneous
Thousands of smaller warships and auxiliaries served in the Kriegsmarine, including minelayers, minesweepers, mine transports, netlayers, floating AA and torpedo batteries, command ships, decoy ships (small merchantmen with hidden weaponry), gunboats, monitors, escorts, patrol boats, sub-chasers, landing craft, landing support ships, training ships, test ships, torpedo recovery boats, dispatch boats, aviso, fishery protection ships, survey ships, harbor defense boats, target ships and their radio control vessels, motor explosive boats, weather ships, tankers, colliers, tenders, supply ships, tugs, barges, icebreakers, hospital and accommodation ships, floating cranes and docks, and many others. The Kriegsmarine employed hundreds of auxiliary Vorpostenboote during the war, mostly civilian ships that were drafted and fitted with military equipment, for use in coastal operations.

Submarines

The Submarine Arm of the Kriegsmarine was titled the U-bootwaffe ("submarine force").
At the outbreak of war, it had a fleet of 57 submarines. This was increased steadily until mid-1943, when losses from Allied counter-measures matched the new vessels launched.

The principal types were the Type IX, a long range type used in the western and southern Atlantic, Indian and Pacific Oceans; the Type VII, the most numerous type, used principally in the north Atlantic; and the small Type II, for coastal waters. Type X was a small class of minelayers and Type XIV was a specialized type used to support distant U-boat operations – the "Milchkuh" (Milkcow).

Types XXI and XXIII, the "Elektroboot", could have negated much of the Allied anti-submarine tactics and technology, but only a few of this new type of U-boat became ready for combat at the end of the war. Post-war, they became the prototype for modern conventional submarines, such as the Soviet .

During World War II, about 60% of all U-boats commissioned were lost in action; 28,000 of the 40,000 U-boat crewmen were killed during the war and 8,000 were captured. The remaining U-boats were either surrendered to the Allies or scuttled by their own crews at the end of the war.

Captured ships
The military campaigns in Europe yielded a large number of captured vessels, many of which were under construction. Nations represented included Austria (riverine craft), Czechoslovakia (riverine craft), Poland, Norway, Denmark, the Netherlands, Belgium, France, Yugoslavia, Greece, Soviet Union, United Kingdom, United States (several landing craft) and Italy (after the armistice). Few of the incomplete ships of destroyer size or above were completed, but many smaller warships and auxiliaries were completed and commissioned into Kriegsmarine during the war. Additionally many captured or confiscated foreign civilian ships (merchantmen, fishing boats, tugboats etc.) were converted into auxiliary warships or support ships.

Major enemy warships sunk or destroyed
The first warship sunk in World War II was the destroyer , of the Polish Navy, by Junkers Ju 87 dive bombers from the carrier air group of aircraft carrier  on 3 September 1939. This carrier air group (Trägergeschwader 186) was part of the Luftwaffe, but at that time under command of the Kriegsmarine.

Organization

Command structure
Adolf Hitler was the Commander-in-Chief of all German armed forces, including the Kriegsmarine. His authority was exercised through the Oberkommando der Marine, or OKM, with a Commander-in-Chief (Oberbefehlshaber der Kriegsmarine), a Chief of Naval General Staff (Chef des Stabes der Seekriegsleitung) and a Chief of Naval Operations (Chef der Operationsabteilung). The first Commander-in-Chief of the OKM was Erich Raeder who was the Commander-in-Chief of the Reichsmarine when it was renamed and reorganized in 1935. Raeder held the post until falling out with Hitler after the German failure in the Battle of the Barents Sea. He was replaced by Karl Dönitz on 30 January 1943 who held the command until he was appointed President of Germany upon Hitler's suicide in April 1945. Hans-Georg von Friedeburg was then Commander-in-Chief of the OKM for the short period of time until Germany surrendered in May 1945.

Subordinate to these were regional, squadron and temporary flotilla commands. Regional commands covered significant naval regions and were themselves sub-divided, as necessary. They were commanded by a Generaladmiral or an Admiral. There was a Marineoberkommando for the Baltic Fleet, Nord, Nordsee, Norwegen, Ost/Ostsee (formerly Baltic), Süd and West. The Kriegsmarine used a form of encoding called Gradnetzmeldeverfahren to denote regions on a map.

Each squadron (organized by type of ship) also had a command structure with its own Flag Officer. The commands were Battleships, Cruisers, Destroyers, Submarines (Führer der Unterseeboote), Torpedo Boats, Minesweepers, Reconnaissance Forces, Naval Security Forces, Big Guns and Hand Guns, and Midget Weapons.

Major naval operations were commanded by a Flottenchef. The Flottenchef controlled a flotilla and organized its actions during the operation. The commands were, by their nature, temporary.

The Kriegsmarine ship design bureau, known as the Marineamt, was administered by officers with experience in sea duty but not in ship design, while the naval architects who did the actual design work had only a theoretical understanding of design requirements. As a result, the German surface fleet was plagued by design flaws throughout the war.

Communication was undertaken using an eight-rotor system of Enigma encoding.

Air units
The Luftwaffe had a near-complete monopoly on all German military aviation, including naval aviation, a major source of ongoing interservice rivalry with the Kriegsmarine. Catapult-launched spotter planes like Arado Ar 196 twin-float seaplanes were manned by the so-called Bordfliegergruppe 196 (shipboard flying group 196). In addition, Trägergeschwader 186 (Carrier Air Wing 186) operated two Gruppen (Trägergruppe I/186 and Trägergruppe II/186) equipped with navalized Messerschmitt Bf 109T and Junkers Ju 87C Stuka; these units were intended to serve aboard the aircraft carrier  which was never completed, yet provided the Kriegsmarine with some air-power from bases on land. Furthermore, five coastal groups (Küstenfliegergruppen) with reconnaissance aircraft, torpedo bombers, Minensuch aerial minesweepers and air-sea rescue seaplanes supported the Kriegsmarine, although with lesser resources as the war progressed.

Coastal artillery, flak and radar units
The coastal batteries of the Kriegsmarine were stationed on the German coasts. With the conquering and occupation of other countries coastal artillery was stationed along the coasts of these countries, especially in France and Norway as part of the Atlantic Wall. Naval bases were protected by flak-batteries of the Kriegsmarine against enemy air raids. The Kriegsmarine also manned the Seetakt sea radars on the coasts.

Marines
At the beginning of World War II, on 1 September 1939, the Marine Stoßtrupp Kompanie (Marine Attack Troop Company) landed in Danzig from the old battleship  for conquering a Polish bastion at Westerplatte. A reinforced platoon of the Marine Stoßtrupp Kompanie landed with soldiers of the German Army from destroyers on 9 April 1940 in Narvik. In June 1940 the Marine Stoßtrupp Abteilung (Marine Attack Troop Battalion) was flown in from France to the Channel Islands to occupy this British territory.

In September 1944 amphibious units unsuccessfully tried to capture the strategic island Suursaari in the Gulf of Finland from Germany's former ally Finland (Operation Tanne Ost).

With the invasion of Normandy in June 1944 and the Soviet advance from the summer of 1944 the Kriegsmarine started to form regiments and divisions for the battles on land with superfluous personnel. With the loss of naval bases because of the Allied advance more and more navy personnel were available for the ground troops of the Kriegsmarine. About 40 regiments were raised and from January 1945 on six divisions. Half of the regiments were absorbed by the divisions.

Personnel strength

Ranks and uniforms

Many different types of uniforms were worn by the Kriegsmarine; here is a list of the main ones:
 Dienstanzug (Service suit)
 Kleiner Dienstanzug (Lesser service uniform)
 Ausgehanzug (Suit for walking out)
 Sportanzug (Sportswear)
 Tropen-und Sommeranzug (Tropical and summer suit) – uniforms for hot climates
 Große Uniform (Parade uniform)
 Kleiner Gesellschaftsanzug (Small party suit)
 Großer Gesellschaftsanzug (Full dress uniform)

See also
 Glossary of German military terms
 List of Knight's Cross of the Iron Cross recipients of the Kriegsmarine
 List of naval ships of Germany
 List of World War II torpedoes of Germany
 Rolf Carls
 Wilhelm Canaris

Notes

Bibliography 

 Bird, Keith. Weimar, the German Naval Officer Corps, and the Rise of National Socialism. Amsterdam: Grüner, 1977.
 Bird, Keith. German Naval History: A Guide to the Literature. New York: Garland, 1985.
 Bräckow, Werner. Die Geschichte des deutschen Marine- Ingenieuroffizierskorps. Hamburg: Stalling, 1974.
 Breyer, Siegfried, and Gerhard Koop. Die deutsche Kriegsmarine, 7 vols., Friedberg: Podzun- Pallas, 1985.
 Dülffer, Jost. Weimar, Hitler, und die Marine. Düsseldorf: Droste, 1973.
 Dülffer, Jost. "Die Reichs- und Kriegsmarine, 1918-1939." In Deutsche Marinegeschichte der Neuzeit, 337-488. Munich: Bernard und Graefe, 1977.
 Güth, Rolf. "Bild einer Crew." Marine Rundschau 61, no. 3 (1964): 131-41.
 Güth, Rolf. "Die Organisation der deutschen Marine in Krieg und Frieden, 1913-1933." In Deutsche Marinegeschichte der Neuzeit, 263-336. Munich: Bernard und Graefe, 1977.
 Güth, Rolf.  "Die Organisation der Kriegsmarine bis 1939." In Wehrmacht und Nationalsozialismus, 1933-1939, 401-500. Munich: Bernard und Graefe, 1978. 
 Krüger, Peter. "Die Verhandlungen über die deutsche Kriegs-und Handelsflotte auf der Konferenz von Potsdam 1945." Marine Rundschau 63, no. 1 (1966): 10-19, 81-94. 
 Lohmann, Walter, and Hans H. Hildebrandt. Die deutsche Kriegsmarine, 1939-1945. 3 vols. Bad Nauheim: Podzun, 1956.
 Löwke, Udo F. Die SPD und die Wehrfrage, 1949-1955. Bonn and Bad Godesberg: Neue Gesellschaft, 1976. 
 Peifer, Douglas. The Three German Navies:  Dissolution, Transition, and New Beginning. Gainesville: University Press of Florida, 2002.
 Rahn, Werner, and Gerhard Schreiber, eds. Kriegstagebuch der Seekriegsleitung, 1939-1945. 68 vols. Herford: E.S. Mittler, 1988-1997.
  Rohwer, Jürgen. Axis Submarine Successes 1939-1945. Annapolis: Naval Institute Press, 1983.
 Rohwer, Jürgen and Gert Hümmelchen. Chronology of the War at Sea, 1939-1945. Translated by Derek Masters. London: Ian Allen, 1974.
 Roskill, Stephen W. The War At Sea, 1939-1945. London: HMSO, 1954-61.
 Rössler, Eberhard. The U-Boat: The Evolution and Technical History of German Submarines. Translated by Harold Erenberg. Annapolis: Naval Institute Press, 1981.
 Salewski, Michael. Die deutsche Seekriegsleitung, 1935-1945, vol. 2, 1942-1945. Munich: Bernard und Graefe, 1975.
 Tarrant, V. E. The Last Year of the Kriegsmarine: May 1944-May 1945. Annapolis: Naval Institute Press, 1994.
 Thomas, Charles S. The German Navy in the Nazi Era. Annapolis: Naval Institute Press, 1990.
 Thompson, Harold Keith, and Henry Strutz. Dönitz at Nuremberg: A Reappraisal: War Crimes and the Military Professional. New York: Amber, 1976.

External links
 The Nazi German Navy 1935-1945 (Kriegsmarine)
 
 
 
 
 
 The photo album of Kriegsmarine minelayer ‘Roland’ crew member. Photos of minelayers on combat missions and various Kriegsmarine vessels.

 
1935 establishments in Germany
Disbanded navies
Military history of Germany during World War II
Naval history of World War II
Wehrmacht